Henrik Schildt (10 July 1914 – 15 March 2001) was a Finnish-born Swedish film actor. He is the father of Johan Schildt, Peter Schildt and Veronica Schildt Bendjelloul.

Selected filmography
 Johan Ulfstjerna (1936)
 Circus (1939)
 The Yellow Clinic (1942)
 Captured by a Voice (1943)
 Katrina (1943)
 The Brothers' Woman (1943)
 Count Only the Happy Moments (1944)
 The Rose of Tistelön (1945)
 Maria of Kvarngarden (1945)
 Blood and Fire (1945)
 Evening at the Djurgarden (1946)
 A Swedish Tiger (1948)
 Each Heart Has Its Own Story (1948)
 Andersson's Kalle (1950)
 Customs Officer Bom (1951)
 Dance, My Doll (1953)
 Hidden in the Fog (1953)
 My Passionate Longing (1956)
 The Hard Game (1956)
 Encounters in the Twilight (1957)

References

Bibliography 
 Goble, Alan. The Complete Index to Literary Sources in Film. Walter de Gruyter, 1999.

External links 
 

1914 births
2001 deaths
Swedish male film actors
Finnish male film actors
Male actors from Helsinki
Finnish emigrants to Sweden
20th-century Swedish male actors